Decimation, Decimate, or variants may refer to:
 Decimation (punishment), punitive discipline
 Decimation (signal processing), reduction of digital signal's sampling rate
 Decimation (comics), 2006 Marvel crossover spinoff  House of M
 Decimate (game show), 2015 BBC television
 The Decimation, an event in the Marvel Cinematic Universe

See also
 Decimator (disambiguation)